Nitrincola is a bacteria genus from the family of Oceanospirillaceae

References

Oceanospirillales
Bacteria genera